Howell Harris (23 January 1714 – 21 July 1773) was a Calvinistic Methodist evangelist. He was one of the main leaders of the Welsh Methodist revival in the 18th century, along with Daniel Rowland and William Williams Pantycelyn.

Life

Harris was born at Trefeca, near Talgarth in Brecknockshire on 23 January 1714. He was the youngest of five children of Howel ap Howel, alias Harris (c. 1672–1731), a carpenter, and his wife, Susannah (died 1751), daughter of Thomas Powell. The family originally hailed from Carmarthenshire, but had settled in Trefeca in 1700, where Howell Sr had purchased a small landholding. Harris's oldest brother Joseph trained as a blacksmith, but went on to secure a post at the Royal Mint after studying in London. His other brother Thomas made his name as a tailor to wealthy clients and amassed enough income to purchase estates in Tregunter and Trefeca, and other properties nearby. He served as High Sheriff of Brecknockshire in 1768.

Harris underwent religious conversion in March 1735 after hearing a parish-church sermon by the Rev. Pryce Davies on the Sunday before Easter, on the necessity of partaking of Holy Communion. This led to several weeks of self-examination, which reached a climax at Communion on Whit Sunday, May 1735. After what is described as answering the devil's accusations, he received Communion and became convinced he had received mercy through the blood of Christ, which gave him a sense of great joy. He immediately began to tell others of this and hold meetings in his home to encourage others to seek the same assurance of Christ's forgiveness.

He failed to be accepted for ordination in the Church of England because of views held to be "Methodist". Instead he became a travelling preacher, tirelessly determined to spread the word through Wales. His preaching often led him into personal danger, persecution and hardship before he gained a following. From 1738 he was supported by Marmaduke Gwynne, a local squire and early convert.

In 1750 Harris retreated to his home at Trefeca, having fallen out with a fellow evangelist, Daniel Rowland, and become the subject of public scandal for his close friendship with "Madam" Sidney Griffith. In 1752 he was inspired by the example of the Moravians to found a religious community there known as Teulu Trefeca (The Trefeca family) with himself as "Father".

Harris had not given up preaching and resumed his former activities in 1763, after a reconciliation with Rowland. He died ten years later and was buried close to his birthplace at Talgarth, where 20,000 people are said to have attended his funeral. There is a memorial to him at Rhydyclafdy, near Pwllheli, where he preached.

He was effectively the founder of the Presbyterian Church of Wales, also known as the Calvinistic Methodist Church.

The papers of Howell Harris
Harris kept a detailed diary and carefully filed the letters he sent and received during his ministry. His papers offer a first-hand account of the Welsh Methodist revival. After his death, they were left to gather dust for over a century before O. M. Edwards, in the 1880s, noted their importance and suggested they ought to be cared for. By this time, the former home of Harris at Trefeca had been turned into a college, whose deputy head, Edwin Williams, took on the task of putting the papers in order. They were kept there until 1910, when the Presbyterian Church of Wales, as their ostensible owner, decided to set up a committee to take care of them and study them.

By 1913 the scale of the work needing to be done on the papers became apparent. Many of the papers were in Latin, and it was estimated that it would take much of a decade and a vast sum of money to ready them for publication. In 1913, it was decided it would be a better use of resources to set up a Historical Society of the Presbyterian Church of Wales, which would publish a regular journal that would include some of Harris's papers.

Probably around 1932, the papers were moved from Trefeca to the denomination's theological college in Aberystwyth. These papers, along with others from Coleg y Bala (an old college of the denomination in Bala, North Wales), were taken in 1934 to be stored safely at the National Library of Wales. There the papers remain in the vaults to this day. Revd Dr Geraint Tudur (son of R. Tudur Jones), formerly Lecturer in Church History at University of Wales, Bangor, and subsequently General Secretary of the Union of Welsh Independents, published a biography: Howell Harris: From Conversion to Separation, 1735–1750 (Cardiff: University of Wales Press, 2000).

References

Bibliography 

Nuttall, Geoffrey (1965). Howell Harris 1714-1773:  The Last Enthusiast. Cardiff:  University of Wales Press.
Lloyd-Jones, D. Martyn (1987). "Howell Harris and Revival," in The Puritans:  Their Origins and Successors. Edinburgh:  The Banner of Truth Trust.
Davies, Gwyn (2002), A light in the land : Christianity in Wales, 200–2000, Bridgend: Bryntirion Press. 
Tudur, Geraint (2001), "Papurau Howell Harris" in Cof Cenedl XVI, Gwasg Gomer.

External links
Harris, Howel(l) 1714–1773 at Welsh Biography Online, National Library of Wales
Lloyd-Jones, Martyn, Howell Harris and revival. Reproduction of article first published in 1973.
Powys Digital History Project, Howell Harris 1714–1773
Howell Harris at 100 Welsh Heroes

1714 births
1773 deaths
People from Brecknockshire
Welsh Protestant religious leaders
Christian revivalists
Calvinistic Methodists
Methodist theologians
18th-century Welsh clergy
18th-century Welsh theologians